El Clásico (also in lowercase letters; ;) is the name given to any football match between rival clubs FC Barcelona and Real Madrid. Originally referring to competitions held in the Spanish championship, the term now includes every match between the clubs, such as those in the UEFA Champions League, Supercopa de España and Copa del Rey. It is considered one of the biggest club football games in the world and is among the most viewed annual sporting events. A fixture known for its intensity, it has featured memorable goal celebrations from both teams, often involving mockery from both sides.

The fixture carries a large-scale political connotation, as Madrid is the capital and largest city of Spain and Barcelona is the capital and largest city of the autonomous community of Catalonia, which has an ongoing independence movement. The two clubs are often identified with opposing political positions, with Real Madrid viewed as representing Spanish nationalism and Barcelona viewed as representing Catalan nationalism. The two clubs are among the wealthiest and most successful football clubs in the world; in 2014 Forbes ranked Barcelona and Real Madrid the world's two most valuable sports teams. Both clubs have a global fanbase; they are the world's two most followed sports teams on social media.

Real Madrid leads in head-to-head results in competitive matches with 101 wins to Barcelona's 100 with 52 draws; Barcelona leads in exhibition matches with 20 victories to Madrid's 4 with 10 draws and in total matches with 120 wins to Madrid's 105 with 62 draws as of the match played on 19 March 2023. Along with Athletic Bilbao, they are the only clubs in La Liga to have never been relegated.

Rivalry

History

The conflict between Real Madrid and Barcelona has long surpassed the sporting dimension, so much that elections to the clubs' presidencies have been strongly politicized. Phil Ball, the author of Morbo: The Story of Spanish Football, says about the match; "they hate each other with an intensity that can truly shock the outsider".

As early as the 1930s, Barcelona "had developed a reputation as a symbol of Catalan identity, opposed to the centralising tendencies of Madrid". In 1936, when Francisco Franco started the coup d'état against the democratic Second Spanish Republic, the president of Barcelona, Josep Sunyol, member of the Republican Left of Catalonia and Deputy to The Cortes, was arrested and executed without trial by Franco's troops (Sunyol was exercising his political activities, visiting Republican troops north of Madrid). During the dictatorships of Miguel Primo de Rivera and especially Francisco Franco, all regional languages and identities in Spain were frowned upon and restrained. As such, most citizens of Barcelona were in strong opposition to the fascist-like regime. In this period, Barcelona gained their motto Més que un club (English: More than a club) because of its alleged connection to Catalan nationalist as well as to progressive beliefs. 

There's an ongoing controversy as to what extent Franco's rule (1939–75) influenced the activities and on-pitch results of both Barcelona and Real Madrid. Most historians agree that Franco did not have a preferred football team, but his Spanish nationalist beliefs led him to associate himself with the establishment teams, such as Atlético Aviación and Madrid FC (that recovered its royal name after the fall of the Republic). On the other hand, he also wanted the renamed CF Barcelona succeed as "Spanish team" rather than a Catalan one. During the early years of Franco's rule, Real Madrid weren't particularly successful, winning two Copa del Generalísimo titles and a Copa Eva Duarte; Barcelona claimed three league titles, one Copa del Generalísimo and one Copa Eva Duarte. During that period, Atlético Aviación were believed to be the preferred team over Real Madrid. The most contested stories of the period include Real Madrid's 11–1 home win against Barcelona in the Copa del Generalísimo, where the Catalan team alleged intimidation, and the controversial transfer of Alfredo Di Stéfano to Real Madrid despite his agreement with Barcelona. The latter transfer was part of Real Madrid chairman Santiago Bernabéu's "revolution" that ushered in the era of unprecedented dominance. Bernabéu, himself a veteran of the Civil War who fought for Franco's forces, saw Real Madrid on top not only of Spanish but also European football, helping create the European Cup, the first true competition for Europe's best club sides. His vision was fulfilled when Real Madrid not only started winning consecutive league titles but also swept the first five editions of the European Cup in the 1950s. These events had a profound impact on Spanish football and influenced Franco's attitude. According to historians, during this time he realized the importance of Real Madrid for his regime's international image, and the club became his preferred team until his death. Fernando Maria Castiella, who served as Minister of Foreign Affairs under Franco from 1957 until 1969, noted that "[Real Madrid] is the best embassy we have ever had." Franco died in 1975, and the Spanish transition to democracy soon followed. Under his rule, Real Madrid had won 14 league titles, 6 Copa del Generalísimo titles, 1 Copa Eva Duarte, 6 European Cups, 2 Latin Cups and 1 Intercontinental Cup. In the same period, Barcelona had won 8 league titles, 9 Copa del Generalísimo titles, 3 Copa Eva Duarte titles, 3 Inter-Cities Fairs Cups and 2 Latin Cups.

The image for both clubs was further affected by the creation of ultras groups, some of which became hooligans. In 1980, Ultras Sur was founded as a far-right-leaning Real Madrid ultras group, followed in 1981 by the foundation of the initially left-leaning and later on far-right, Barcelona ultras group Boixos Nois. Both groups became known for their violent acts, and one of the most conflictive factions of Barcelona supporters, the Casuals, became a full-fledged criminal organisation.

For many people, Barcelona is still considered as "the rebellious club", or the alternative pole to "Real Madrid's conservatism". According to polls released by CIS (Centro de Investigaciones Sociológicas), Real Madrid is the favorite team of most of the Spanish residents, while Barcelona stands in the second position. In Catalonia, forces of all the political spectrum are overwhelmingly in favour of Barcelona. Nevertheless, the support of the blaugrana club goes far beyond from that region, earning its best results among young people, sustainers of a federal structure of Spain and citizens with left-wing ideology, in contrast with Real Madrid fans which politically tend to adopt right-wing views.

1943 Copa del Generalísimo semi-finals

On 13 June 1943, Real Madrid beat Barcelona 11–1 at the Chamartín in the second leg of the Copa del Generalísimo semi-finals (the Copa del Presidente de la República having been renamed in honour of General Franco). The first leg, played at the Les Corts in Catalonia, had ended with Barcelona winning 3–0. Madrid complained about all the three goals that referee Fombona Fernández had allowed for Barcelona, with the home supporters also whistling Madrid throughout, whom they accused of employing roughhouse tactics, and Fombona for allowing them to. Barça’s Josep Escolà was stretchered off in the first half with José María Querejeta’s stud marks in his stomach. A campaign began in Madrid. The newspaper Ya reported the whistling as a "clear intention to attack the representatives of Spain." Barcelona player Josep Valle recalled: "The press officer at the DND and ABC newspaper wrote all sorts of scurrilous lies, really terrible things, winding up the Madrid fans like never before". Former Real Madrid goalkeeper Eduardo Teus, who admitted that Madrid had "above all played hard", wrote in a newspaper: "the ground itself made Madrid concede two of the three goals, goals that were totally unfair".

Barcelona fans were banned from traveling to Madrid. Real Madrid released a statement after the match which former club president Ramón Mendoza explained, "The message got through that those fans who wanted to could go to El Club bar on Calle de la Victoria where Madrid's social center was. There, they were given a whistle. Others had whistles handed to them with their tickets." The day of the second leg, the Barcelona team were insulted and stones were thrown at their bus as soon as they left their hotel. Barcelona's striker Mariano Gonzalvo said of the incident, "Five minutes before the game had started, our penalty area was already full of coins." Barcelona goalkeeper Lluis Miró rarely approached his line—when he did, he was armed with stones. As Francisco Calvet told the story, "They were shouting: Reds! Separatists!... a bottle just missed Sospedra that would have killed him if it had hit him. It was all set up."

Real Madrid went 2–0 up within half an hour. The third goal brought with it a sending off for Barcelona's Benito García after he made what Calvet claimed was a "completely normal tackle". Madrid's José Llopis Corona recalled, "At which point, they got a bit demoralized," while Ángel Mur countered, "at which point, we thought: 'go on then, score as many as you want'." Madrid scored in minutes 31', 33', 35', 39', 43' and 44', as well as two goals ruled out for offside, made it 8–0. Juan Samaranch wrote: "In that atmosphere and with a referee who wanted to avoid any complications, it was humanly impossible to play... If the azulgranas had played badly, really badly, the scoreboard would still not have reached that astronomical figure. The point is that they did not play at all." Both clubs were fined 2,500 pesetas by the Royal Spanish Football Federation and, although Barcelona appealed, it made no difference. Piñeyro resigned in protest, complaining of "a campaign that the press has run against Barcelona for a week and which culminated in the shameful day at Chamartín".

The match report in the newspaper La Prensa described Barcelona's only goal as a "reminder that there was a team there who knew how to play football and that if they did not do so that afternoon, it was not exactly their fault". Another newspaper called the scoreline "as absurd as it was abnormal". According to football writer Sid Lowe, "There have been relatively few mentions of the game [since] and it is not a result that has been particularly celebrated in Madrid. Indeed, the 11–1 occupies a far more prominent place in Barcelona's history. This was the game that first formed the identification of Madrid as the team of the dictatorship and Barcelona as its victims." Fernando Argila, Barcelona's reserve goalkeeper from the game, said, "There was no rivalry. Not, at least, until that game."

Di Stéfano transfer

The rivalry was intensified during the 1950s when the clubs disputed the signing of Argentine forward Alfredo Di Stéfano. Di Stéfano had impressed both Barcelona and Real Madrid while playing for Los Millionarios in Bogotá, Colombia, during a players' strike in his native Argentina. Soon after Millonarios' return to Colombia, Barcelona directors visited Buenos Aires and agreed with River Plate, the last FIFA-affiliated team to have held Di Stéfano's rights, for his transfer in 1954 for the equivalent of 150 million Italian lira ($200,000 according to other sources). This started a battle between the two Spanish rivals for his rights. FIFA appointed Armando Muñoz Calero, former president of the Spanish Football Federation as mediator. Calero decided to let Di Stéfano play the 1953–54 and 1955–56 seasons in Madrid, and the 1954–55 and 1956–57 seasons in Barcelona. The agreement was approved by the Football Association and their respective clubs. Although the Catalans agreed, the decision created various discontent among the Blaugrana members and the president was forced to resign in September 1953. Barcelona sold Madrid their half-share, and Di Stéfano moved to Los Blancos, signing a four-year contract. Real paid 5.5 million Spanish pesetas for the transfer, plus a 1.3 million bonus for the purchase, an annual fee to be paid to the Millonarios, and a 16,000 salary for Di Stéfano with a bonus double that of his teammates, for a total of 40% of the annual revenue of the Madrid club.

Di Stéfano became integral in the subsequent success achieved by Real Madrid, scoring twice in his first game against Barcelona. With him, Madrid won the first five editions of the European Cup. The 1960s saw the rivalry reach the European stage when Real Madrid and Barcelona met twice in the European Cup, with Madrid triumphing en route to their fifth consecutive title in 1959–60 and Barcelona prevailing en route to losing the final in 1960–61.

Final of the bottles
On 11 July 1968, Barcelona beat Real Madrid 1–0 in the Copa del Generalísimo final at the Santiago Bernabéu. Real Madrid fans, angry about the refereeing, started throwing bottles at the referee and Barcelona players in the last minutes of the match. Antonio Rigo, the referee of the final, was accused of favouring Barcelona. Regarding the two not awarded penalties, he said "I didn't see a penalty on Amancio, and Serena tripped. He wanted to deceive me by diving when he entered the penalty area." He also accused the Real Madrid manager of trying to bribe him with a pre-match gift. General Franco presented the trophy to Barcelona with a pitch full of bottles, hence the name.

Luís Figo transfer

In 2000, Real Madrid's then-presidential candidate, Florentino Pérez, offered Barcelona's vice-captain Luís Figo $2.4 million to sign an agreement binding him to Madrid if he won the elections. If the player broke the deal, he would have to pay Pérez $30 million in compensation. When his agent confirmed the deal, Figo denied everything, insisting, "I'll stay at Barcelona whether Pérez wins or loses." He accused the presidential candidate of "lying" and "fantasizing". He told Barcelona teammates Luis Enrique and Pep Guardiola he was not leaving and they conveyed the message to the Barcelona squad.

On 9 July, Sport ran an interview in which he said, "I want to send a message of calm to Barcelona's fans, for whom I always have and always will feel great affection. I want to assure them that Luís Figo will, with absolute certainty, be at the Camp Nou on the 24th to start the new season... I've not signed a pre-contract with a presidential candidate at Real Madrid. No. I'm not so mad as to do a thing like that."

The only way Barcelona could prevent Figo's transfer to Real Madrid was to pay the penalty clause, $30 million. That would have effectively meant paying the fifth highest transfer fee in history to sign their own player. Barcelona's new president, Joan Gaspart, called the media and told them, "Today, Figo gave me the impression that he wanted to do two things: get richer and stay at Barça." Only one of them happened. The following day, 24 July, Figo was presented in Madrid and handed his new shirt by Alfredo Di Stéfano. His buyout clause was set at $180 million. Gaspart later admitted, "Figo's move destroyed us."

On his return to Barcelona in a Real Madrid shirt, banners with "Judas", "Scum" and "Mercenary" were hung around the stadium. Thousands of fake 10,000 peseta notes had been printed and emblazoned with his image, were among the missiles of oranges, bottles, cigarette lighters, even a couple of mobile phones were thrown at him. In his third season with Real Madrid, the 2002 Clásico at Camp Nou produced one of the defining images of the rivalry. Figo was mercilessly taunted throughout; missiles of coins, a knife, a whisky bottle, were raining down from the stands, mostly from areas populated by the Boixos Nois where he had been taking a corner. Among the debris was a pig's head.

Recent issues

During the last three decades, the rivalry has been augmented by the modern Spanish tradition of the pasillo, where one team is given the guard of honor by the other team, once the former clinches the La Liga trophy before El Clásico takes place. This has happened in three occasions. First, during El Clásico that took place on 30 April 1988, where Real Madrid won the championship on the previous round. Then, three years later, when Barcelona won the championship two rounds before El Clásico on 8 June 1991. The last pasillo, and most recent, took place on 7 May 2008, and this time Real Madrid had won the championship. In May 2018, Real Madrid refused to perform pasillo to Barcelona even though the latter had already wrapped up the championship a round prior to their meeting. Real Madrid's coach at the time, Zinedine Zidane, reasoned that Barcelona also refused to perform it five months earlier, on 23 December 2017, when Real Madrid were the FIFA Club World Cup champions.

The two teams met again in the UEFA Champions League semi-finals in 2002, with Real winning 2–0 in Barcelona and drawing 1–1 in Madrid, resulting in a 3–1 aggregate win for Los Blancos. The tie was dubbed by Spanish media as the "Match of the Century".

While El Clásico is regarded as one of the fiercest rivalries in world football, there have been rare moments when fans have shown praise for a player on the opposing team. In 1980, Laurie Cunningham was the first Real Madrid player to receive applause from Barcelona fans at Camp Nou; after excelling during the match, and with Madrid winning 2–0, Cunningham left the field to a standing ovation from the locals. On 26 June 1983, during the second leg of the Copa de la Liga final at the Santiago Bernabéu in Madrid, having dribbled past the Real Madrid goalkeeper, Barcelona star Diego Maradona ran towards an empty goal before stopping just as the Madrid defender Juan José came sliding in an attempt to block the shot and crashed into the post, before Maradona slotted the ball into the net. The manner of Maradona's goal led to many Madrid fans inside the stadium start applauding. In November 2005, Ronaldinho became the second Barcelona player to receive a standing ovation from Madrid fans at the Santiago Bernabéu. After dribbling through the Madrid defence twice to score two goals in a 3–0 win, Madrid fans paid homage to his performance with applause. On 21 November 2015, Andrés Iniesta became the third Barcelona player to receive applause from Real Madrid fans while he was substituted during a 4–0 away win, with Iniesta scoring Barça's third. He was already a popular figure throughout Spain for scoring the nation's World Cup winning goal in 2010.

A 2007 survey by the Centro de Investigaciones Sociológicas showed that 32% of the Spanish population supported Real Madrid, while 25% supported Barcelona. In third place came Valencia, with 5%. According to an Ikerfel poll in 2011, Barcelona is the most popular team in Spain with 44% of preferences, while Real Madrid is second with 37%. Atlético Madrid, Valencia and Athletic Bilbao complete the top five.

The rivalry intensified in 2011, when Barcelona and Real Madrid were scheduled to meet each other four times in 18 days, including the Copa Del Rey final and UEFA Champions League semi-finals. Several accusations of unsportsmanlike behaviour from both teams and a war of words erupted throughout the fixtures which included four red cards. Spain national team coach Vicente del Bosque stated that he was "concerned" that due to the rising hatred between the two clubs, that this could cause friction in the Spain team.

A fixture known for its intensity and indiscipline, it has also featured memorable goal celebrations from both teams, often involving mocking the opposition. In October 1999, Real Madrid forward Raúl silenced 100,000 Barcelona fans at the Camp Nou when he scored an 86th–minute equalizer before he celebrated by putting a finger to his lips as if telling the crowd to be quiet. In May 2009, Barcelona captain Carles Puyol kissed his Catalan armband in front of Madrid fans at the Santiago Bernabéu after his 21st–minute headed goal in a 6–2 win. Cristiano Ronaldo twice gestured to the hostile crowd to "calm down" after scoring against Barcelona at the Camp Nou in 2012 and 2016, both being the winning goals in 2–1 wins. In April 2017, in Barcelona's 3–2 win, Messi celebrated his 93rd-minute winner against Real Madrid at the Santiago Bernabéu by taking off his Barcelona shirt and holding it up to incensed Real Madrid fans – with his name and number facing them. Later that year, in August, Ronaldo was subbed on during the 3–1 first leg victory in the Supercopa de España, proceeded to score in the 80th minute and took his shirt off before holding it up to Barça's fans with his name and number facing them. However, he was sent–off moments later for a second yellow for simulation.

Women's Clásico 
The passion of the rivalry has also extended to women's football, although Real Madrid Femenino was only founded in 2020 whereas FC Barcelona Femení is more than 30 years older and has been one of the country's leading clubs since the 2010s. The second leg of the UEFA Women's Champions League quarter-finals between the clubs at Camp Nou on 30 March 2022 was attended by 91,553 spectators; at the time, this was the largest known confirmed attendance for any women's football match (the 1971 Mexico–Denmark game with unconfirmed 110,000 would otherwise be a record). Reigning continental champions Barcelona won 5–2 on the day and 8–3 on aggregate. The attendance was later surpassed in Barcelona's next Champions League match, the semi-finals first leg against VfL Wolfsburg, held at Camp Nou.

Due to Real Madrid being such a new club, for the first few years of its existence, the Clásico between the women's sides was questionable, especially as these years also marked a golden generation of Barcelona's women's team, with few other clubs able to come close. However, Real Madrid's rapid improvement saw their ability level quickly see them become one of the best teams in Spain and become a more worthy opponent for Barcelona. The record attendance in March 2022 marked the moment a real sense of rivalry was felt, though both clubs indicated that they also wanted to work together to help women's football grow. Off the pitch affairs have further contributed to a rivalry; since mid-2022, several top Spanish women's teams, prominently Barcelona, have openly rejected the governing body (RFEF), with Real Madrid being the highest team to stay on side with the RFEF.

Player rivalries

László Kubala and Alfredo Di Stéfano

Until the early 1950s, Real Madrid was not a regular title contender in Spain, having won only two Primera División titles between 1929 and 1953. However, things changed for Real after the arrival of Alfredo Di Stéfano in 1953, Francisco Gento in the same year, Raymond Kopa in 1956, and Ferenc Puskás in 1958. Real Madrid's strength increased in this period until the team dominated Spain and Europe, while Barcelona relied on its Hungarian star László Kubala and Luis Suárez, who joined in 1955 in addition to the Hungarian players Sándor Kocsis and Zoltán Czibor and the Brazilian Evaristo. With the arrival of Kubala and Di Stéfano, Barcelona and Real Madrid became among the most important European clubs in those years, and the players represented the turning point in the history of their teams.

With Kubala and Di Stéfano, a rivalry was born, but it would still take a long time to become what it is today. This period was characterized by the abundance of matches in different tournaments, as they faced each other in all the tournaments available at the time, especially at the European level, where they met twice in two consecutive seasons. In their period, El Clásico was played 26 times: Real won 13 matches, Barcelona 10 matches, and 3 ended in a draw. Di Stéfano scored 14 and Kubala scored 4 goals in those matches.

Cristiano Ronaldo and Lionel Messi

The rivalry between Lionel Messi and Cristiano Ronaldo between 2009 and 2018 has been the most competitive in El Clásico history, with both players being their clubs' all-time top scorers. In their period, many records were broken for both clubs; the two players alternated as top scorers in La Liga and the Champions League during most seasons while they were with Real Madrid and Barcelona. During this period, Ronaldo won the European Golden Shoe three times and Messi five times. In addition, Messi won the Ballon d'Or five times and Ronaldo four times.

During the nine years they played together in Spain, the two players scored a total of 922 goals, including 38 goals in El Clásico matches, 20 scored by Messi and 18 by Ronaldo. As of 2023, Ronaldo is the all-time top scorer in the UEFA Champions League, followed by Messi in the second place. In addition, Messi is the all-time top scorer of La Liga with 474 goals, and Ronaldo is ranked second with 311 goals. Both players contributed to their club's record for the most points in La Liga history, with 100 points in the 2011–12 season for Real Madrid and in the 2012–13 season for Barcelona.

The Messi–Ronaldo rivalry was characterized by a lot of goals scored by both players, in addition to many domestic and European titles that they were a major reason for achieving them. In their period, they contributed to the dominance of their clubs in Europe, as they won six Champions League titles in eight seasons, including five consecutive seasons between 2014 and 2018. In El Clásico matches, Messi has scored 26 goals in his career which is a record. Ronaldo has scored 18, which is the joint second most in the fixture's history alongside Di Stéfano. Ronaldo, on the other hand, has a slight advantage in terms of minutes per goal ratio, scoring a goal for every 141 minutes played in El Clásico matches. Only slightly behind is Messi, scoring a goal every 151.54 minutes.

In their period, the rivalry between Real Madrid and Barcelona has been encapsulated by the rivalry between Ronaldo and Messi. Following the star signings of Neymar and Luis Suárez by Barcelona, and Gareth Bale and Karim Benzema by Real Madrid, the rivalry was expanded to a battle of the clubs' attacking trios, nicknamed "BBC" (Bale–Benzema–Cristiano) and "MSN" (Messi–Suárez–Neymar). Ronaldo left Real Madrid for Juventus in 2018, and in the week prior to the first meeting of the teams in the 2018–19 La Liga, Messi sustained an arm injury ruling him out of the match. It would be the first time since 2007 that the Clásico had featured neither player, with some in the media describing it as the 'end of an era'. Barcelona won the match 5–1.

Statistics

Matches summary

Head-to-head ranking in La Liga (1929–2022)

 Total: Real Madrid with 47 higher finishes, Barcelona with 44 higher finishes (as of the end of the 2021–22 season).
 The biggest difference in positions for Real Madrid from Barcelona is 10 places in the 1941–42 season; the biggest difference in positions for Barcelona from Real Madrid is 10 places in the 1947–48 season.

Hat-tricks

21 players have scored a hat-trick in official El Clásico matches.

Notes
 4 = 4 goals scored; (H) = Home, (A) = Away, (N) = Neutral location; home team score listed first.
 Not including friendly matches.

Stadiums

Since the first match in 1902, the official Clásico matches have been held at thirteen stadiums, twelve of those in Spain. The following table shows the details of the stadiums that hosted the Clásico. The following table does not include other stadiums that hosted the friendly matches.

Honours
The rivalry reflected in El Clásico matches comes about as Barcelona and Real Madrid are the most successful football clubs in Spain. As seen below, Real Madrid leads Barcelona 100 to 98 in terms of official overall trophies. While the Inter-Cities Fairs Cup is recognised as the predecessor to the UEFA Cup, and the Latin Cup is recognised as one of the predecessors of the European Cup, both were not organised by UEFA. Consequently, UEFA does not consider clubs' records in the Fairs Cup nor Latin Cup to be part of their European record. However, FIFA does view the competitions as a major honour. The one-off Ibero-American Cup was later recognised as an official tournament organised by CONMEBOL and the Royal Spanish Football Federation.

Records
 Friendly matches are not included in the following records unless otherwise noted.

Results

Biggest wins (5+ goals)

Most goals in a match

Longest runs

Most consecutive wins

Most consecutive draws

Most consecutive matches without a draw

Longest undefeated runs

Longest undefeated runs in the league

Most consecutive matches without conceding a goal

Most consecutive games scoring

Other records

 Most common result: 2–1 (46 times)
 Least common result: 11–1, 8–2, 7–2, 6–6, 6–2, 5–5 and 5–3 (once each)
 Most common draw result: 1–1 (25 times)

Players

Goalscoring

Top goalscorers
 Players in bold are still active for Real Madrid or Barcelona.
 Numbers in bold are the record for goals in the competition.
 Does not include friendly matches.

Consecutive goalscoring

Most appearances

 Players in bold are still active for Real Madrid or Barcelona.

Goalkeeping

Most clean sheets

Consecutive clean sheets

Assists
 Most assists: 14 –  Lionel Messi
 Most assists in one match: 4 –  Xavi (2 May 2009, La Liga)
 Most assists in one season: 5 –  Lionel Messi (2011–12)

Disciplinary
 Most yellow cards: 22 –  Sergio Ramos
 Most red cards: 5 –  Sergio Ramos

Other records 
 Most penalties scored: 6 –  Lionel Messi
 Most direct free kicks scored: 2
  Ronald Koeman (1991–92 La Liga & 1993–94 La Liga)
  Lionel Messi (2012 Supercopa de España & 2012–13 La Liga)
 Most matches won: 23 –  Sergio Busquets
 Most matches lost: 20 –  Sergio Ramos
 Most hat-tricks: 2
  Santiago Bernabéu (both in 1916 Copa del Rey)
  Jaime Lazcano (1929–30 La Liga & 1934–35 La Liga)
  Ferenc Puskás (1962–63 La Liga & 1963–64 La Liga)
  Lionel Messi (2006–07 La Liga & 2013–14 La Liga)
 Youngest scorer:  –  Alfonso Navarro, 1946–47 La Liga, 30 March 1947
 Oldest scorer:  –  Alfredo Di Stéfano, 1963–64 La Liga, 15 December 1963
 Fastest goal: 21 seconds –  Karim Benzema, 2011–12 La Liga, 10 December 2011
 Fastest penalty scored: 2 minutes –  Pirri, 1976–77 La Liga, 30 January 1977
 Most different tournaments scored in: 4 –  Pedro (La Liga, UEFA Champions League, Copa del Rey and Supercopa de España)
 Most seasons scored in: 11 –  Paco Gento: (1954–55, 1958–59, 1959–60, 1960–61, 1961–62, 1962–63, 1963–64, 1965–66, 1967–68, 1968–69 and 1969–70)
 Most goals in one season: 8 –  Santiago Bernabéu (1915–16)
 Most different stadiums scored in: 4
   Santillana (Santiago Bernabéu, Camp Nou, Vicente Calderón and La Romareda)
   Karim Benzema (Santiago Bernabéu, Camp Nou, Alfredo Di Stéfano Stadium and King Fahd International Stadium)
 Three players scored for both clubs in El Clásico:
  Josep Samitier (in 1925–26 and 1931–32 for Barcelona and in 1932–33 and 1933–34 for Madrid FC)
  Luís Figo (in 1995–96, 1997–98 and 1999–2000 for Barcelona and in 2001–02 for Real Madrid)
  Ronaldo (in 1996–97 for Barcelona and in 2002–03, 2003–04, 2004–05 and 2005–06 for Real Madrid)

Managers

Most appearances

Most wins

Personnel at both clubs

Players

Barcelona to Real Madrid
 1902:  Alfonso Albéniz
 1906:  José Quirante
 1908:  Charles Wallace
 1911:  Arsenio Comamala
 1913:  Walter Rozitsky
 1930:  Ricardo Zamora (via Espanyol)
 1932:  Josep Samitier
 1949:  Joaquín Navarro (via Sabadell)
 1950:  Alfonso Navarro
 1959:  László Kaszás
 1961:  Justo Tejada
 1962:  Evaristo
 1965:  Fernand Goyvaerts
 1988:  Bernd Schuster
 1990:  Luis Milla
 1992:  Nando Muñoz
 1994:  Michael Laudrup 
 1995:  Miquel Soler (via Sevilla)
 2000:  Luís Figo 
 2000:  Albert Celades (via Celta Vigo)
 2002:  Ronaldo (via Inter Milan)
 2007:  Javier Saviola

Real Madrid to Barcelona
 1905:  Luciano Lizarraga
 1909:  Enrique Normand Faurie
 1939:  Hilario (via Valencia)
 1946:  Josep Canal
 1961:  Chus Pereda (via Sevilla)
 1965:  Lucien Muller
 1980:  Amador Lorenzo (via Hércules)
 1994:  Gheorghe Hagi (via Brescia)
 1994:  Julen Lopetegui (via Logroñés)
 1995:  Robert Prosinečki
 1996:  Luis Enrique
 1999:  Dani García Lara (via Mallorca)
 2000:  Alfonso Pérez (via Real Betis)
 2004:  Samuel Eto'o (via Mallorca)
 2022:  Marcos Alonso (via Bolton Wanderers, Fiorentina and Chelsea)

Managers

Only two coaches have been at the helm of both clubs:

  Enrique Fernández
 Barcelona: 1947–1950
 Real Madrid: 1953–1954

  Radomir Antić
 Real Madrid: 1991–1992
 Barcelona: 2003

See also
 
 El Clásico (basketball) 
 Madrid Derby 
 Derbi barceloní
 Major football rivalries
 National and regional identity in Spain 
 Nationalism and sport
 List of sports rivalries

Notes

References

External links

 
 
 

FC Barcelona
Real Madrid CF
El Clásico
Politics and sports
Football in Barcelona
Football in the Community of Madrid
Recurring sporting events established in 1902
Nicknamed sporting events